Spiritual Milk for Boston Babes  is a children's catechism by the minister John Cotton.  The 1656 catechism is the first known children's book published in America.

Content 
Cotton's catechism consisted of fifteen pages of 64 questions and answers relating to teachings of Puritanism and the Church. It discussed morals, manners, religious life, the ten commandments, and the last judgment. In the seventeenth century, many English catechisms had over 100 questions and answers for the student of Christianity to remember. The 64 questions and answers in Cotton's catechism made reference to 203 passages from the Old and the New Testaments. "Spiritual Milk for Boston Babes" and other similar catechisms encapsulate for children the good news of Jesus Christ. "Spiritual Milk" is a witness to the transformative work of Jesus and an encouragement to trust in the redeeming work of God.

Versions 
Cotton's catechism was originally printed in London in 1646. The full title in Great Britain was Milk for Babes. Drawn out of the Breasts of Both Testaments. Chiefly, for the Spiritually Nourishment of Boston Babes in Either England: But May Be of Like Use for Any Children. It was printed in London, England, by J. Coe for bookseller Henry Overton. The short title in Great Britain of the prior original work of 1646 is  Milk for Babes.

The New England full version was called Spiritual Milk for Boston Babes in Either England. Drawn out of the Breasts of Both Testaments for Their Souls Nourishment but May Be of Like Use to Any Children. By John Cotton, B.D. late Teacher to the Church of Boston in New England. Cambridge. Printed by S. G. for Hezekiah Usher at Boston in New England, 1656. Samuel Green of Cambridge, Massachusetts, printed it in 1656 for bookseller Hezekiah Usher. It was an octavo booklet. A copy of this book was supposedly purchased by the Lenox Library of Massachusetts for $400 in 1895. Cotton's catechism remained in print in both England and New England for some 200 years after the mid seventeenth century. Eight known editions have been identified from the seventeenth century alone.

Legacy 
Spiritual Milk for Boston Babes became part of The New England Primer in the mid of the eighteenth century and remained popular into the mid nineteenth century. Spiritual Milk for Boston Babes was called "The Catechism of New England".

References

Bibliography

External links 
 Full text electronic edition at University of Nebraska–Lincoln's DigitalCommons
 Full text scans at the New York Public Library

Books about Christianity
New England Puritanism
American children's books
1656 books
Catechisms
Christian children's books
Protestant education